Levelange (Luxembourgish: Liewel or Leewel) is a village in northwestern Luxembourg.

It is situated in the commune of Beckerich and has a population of 55.

References 

Villages in Luxembourg